The 2013 Northwestern Wildcats football team represented Northwestern University during the 2013 NCAA Division I FBS football season. Pat Fitzgerald, in his eighth season at Northwestern, was the team's head coach. The Wildcats home games were played at Ryan Field in Evanston, Illinois. They were members of the Legends Division of the Big Ten Conference.

Previous season
The Wildcats won their first bowl game since the 1949 Rose Bowl against California by defeating Mississippi State in the Gator Bowl 34–20.

Personnel

Coaching staff

Schedule

Game summaries

California

Syracuse

Western Michigan

Maine

Ohio State

For the first time since November 11, 1995, ESPN's College GameDay was broadcast from Evanston prior to the game.

Wisconsin

Minnesota

Iowa

Nebraska

Michigan

Michigan State

Illinois

Rankings

References

Northwestern
Northwestern Wildcats football seasons
Northwestern Wildcats football